Luis P. Valdivieso (ca. 1845 – ca. 1920) was the Mayor of Ponce, Puerto Rico, in 1905.

During Valdivieso's term as mayor, the Legislative Assembly of Puerto Rico repealed a law whereby the neighboring municipality of Guayanilla had been annexed to Ponce.

See also

 Ponce, Puerto Rico
 List of Puerto Ricans

References

Further reading
 Fay Fowlie de Flores. Ponce, Perla del Sur: Una Bibliografía Anotada. Second Edition. 1997. Ponce, Puerto Rico: Universidad de Puerto Rico en Ponce. p. 116. Item 589. 
 Felix Bernier Matos. Cromos ponceños. (por Fray Justo) Ponce, Puerto Rico: Imprenta "La Libertad." 1896. (Colegio Universitario Tecnológico de Ponce, CUTPO)
 Fay Fowlie de Flores. Ponce, Perla del Sur: Una Bibliografía Anotada. Second Edition. 1997. Ponce, Puerto Rico: Universidad de Puerto Rico en Ponce. p. 332. Item 1655. 
 Ponce. Oficina del Alcalde. Al pueblo de Ponce y el Hon. Gobernador de Puerto Rico. Tipografía Baldorioty. 1902–1906. (Universidad de Puerto Rico - Rio Piedras.)
 Fay Fowlie de Flores. Ponce, Perla del Sur: Una Bibliografía Anotada. Second Edition. 1997. Ponce, Puerto Rico: Universidad de Puerto Rico en Ponce. p. 336. Item 1675. 
 Ponce. Gobierno Municipal. Informe actividades administrativas y económicas del Municipio de Ponce. (Also titled Informe del Alcalde de la Ciudad de Ponce) Ponce, Puerto Rico: Tip. Baldorioty. 1905. (Archivo Histórico Municipal de Ponce)

Mayors of Ponce, Puerto Rico
1840s births
1920s deaths
Year of birth uncertain